The 1968 Camden Council election took place on 9 May 1968 to elect members of Camden London Borough Council in London, England. The whole council was up for election and the Conservative party gained overall control of the council.

Background

Election result

Ward results

Adelaide

Belsize

Bloomsbury

Camden

Chalk Farm

Euston

Gospel Oak

Grafton

Hampstead Central

Hampstead Town

Highgate

Holborn

Kilburn

King's Cross

Priory

Regent's Park

St John's

St Pancras

West End

References

1968
1968 London Borough council elections